Barambah Homestead is a heritage-listed homestead at Goomeri Road, Barambah, Gympie Region, Queensland, Australia. It was designed by Frederic Herbert Faircloth and built from 1843 to 1880s circa. It was added to the Queensland Heritage Register on 21 August 1992.

Heritage listing 

Barambah Homestead was listed on the Queensland Heritage Register on 21 August 1992 having satisfied the following criteria.

The place is important in demonstrating the evolution or pattern of Queensland's history.

Barambah station was established in 1843 by Ferriter and Uhr in the wake of Henry Stuart Russell's exploration of the Burnett district in 1842. The Barambah site once comprised a complete homestead complex, with some structures reputedly built during the 1870s. Today, the timber residence built in -06 stands as testimony to the development of Barambah as one of the earliest principal pastoral holdings in the Burnett district. The physical improvement of the site reflects the growth of the Queensland rural economy during the early 20th century.

The place is important in demonstrating the principal characteristics of a particular class of cultural places.

Despite extensive renovations to the house, the main original divisions between the living areas and private spaces, such as bedrooms, and the internal core and encircling verandahs, remain intact, with the exception of the rear enclosed verandah areas. The place demonstrates the principal characteristics of a substantial Queensland timber residence built in the first decade of the 20th century. The significant associated buildings present in the homestead complex assist in demonstrating how this kind of pastoral property would have operated.

The place is important because of its aesthetic significance.

The residence exhibits a high standard of workmanship and architectural design, and its elevated position, amidst early garden remnants and overlooking a watercourse, enhances the aesthetic appeal of the site.

The place has a special association with the life or work of a particular person, group or organisation of importance in Queensland's history.

Barambah has a special association with the Moore family, who owned the property for nearly 100 years and who developed it during that time as one of the pre-eminent cattle stations in the Burnett district.

References

Attribution

External links

Queensland Heritage Register
Gympie Region
Homesteads in Queensland
Articles incorporating text from the Queensland Heritage Register